|}

The Radley Stakes is a Listed flat horse race in Great Britain open to fillies aged two years only.
It is run at Newbury over a distance of 7 furlongs (1,408 metres), and it is scheduled to take place each year in October. It is currently known for sponsorship reasons as the Racing TV Stakes.

Winners since 1988

See also
 Horse racing in Great Britain
 List of British flat horse races

References 

 Paris-Turf: 

Racing Post: 

Flat races in Great Britain
Newbury Racecourse
Flat horse races for two-year-old fillies